Sean Tyree Colson (born July 1, 1975) is an American former professional basketball player. He was born in Philadelphia, Pennsylvania.
At a height of 6'0" (1.83 m) tall, he played at the point guard position.

College career
Colson attended the University of Rhode Island, the University of North Carolina at Charlotte, and Hagerstown Junior College.

Professional playing career
Colson split the 2000–01 National Basketball Association season with the Atlanta Hawks and Houston Rockets.

Colson also played with the Dodge City Legend of the USBL, the Grand Rapids Hoops of the CBA and in Italy, France, Turkey, Poland, Ukraine, Latvia, Lebanon, Kuwait, and Venezuela.

He was selected to the All-CBA First Team while playing in the CBA for the Grand Rapids Hoops during the 2001–02 season.

Coaching career
Colson is currently head basketball coach at Martin Luther King High School, in Philadelphia.

References

External links
NBA.com player profile
NBA stats @ basketballreference.com

1975 births
Living people
American expatriate basketball people in France
American expatriate basketball people in Israel
American expatriate basketball people in Italy
American expatriate basketball people in Latvia
American expatriate basketball people in Lebanon
American expatriate basketball people in Poland
American expatriate basketball people in Russia
American expatriate basketball people in Turkey
American expatriate basketball people in Ukraine
American expatriate basketball people in Venezuela
American men's basketball players
ASK Riga players
Atlanta Hawks players
Basketball players from Philadelphia
BC Dynamo Moscow players
BC Kyiv players
Besançon BCD players
Charlotte 49ers men's basketball players
Grand Rapids Hoops players
Houston Rockets players
HTV Basket players
Ironi Nahariya players
Israeli Basketball Premier League players
Junior college men's basketball players in the United States
Juvecaserta Basket players
Point guards
Rhode Island Rams men's basketball players
Roseto Sharks players
Trotamundos B.B.C. players
Undrafted National Basketball Association players
United States Basketball League players
Maine Central Institute alumni